Beşyol is a village in the Besni District, Adıyaman Province, Turkey. Its population is 539 (2021).

The hamlets of Evcili, Karakeçi and Konak are attached to the village.

References

Villages in Besni District